The Baluch is a composition by Iranian composer Mehdi Hosseini for six instruments, written in 2009. It is in three movements and inspired by Persian folk music.

It is one of the first works of Hosseini's total minimalism work. It was premiered on 11 June 2009 at the Saint Petersburg House of Composers. This performance was given by selected soloists from the St. Petersburg State Conservatory and the St. Petersburg Philharmonic Orchestra, and was conducted by Brad Cawyer, an American conductor based in Saint Petersburg.

There are three movements:

Liku Dalgani
Kalampour
Zoljalal-Guati

External links
Interview with Mehdi Hosseini, by Kremena KrumovaThe, The Epoch Times, New York 2009.
Tehran Times
Payvand News

Compositions by Mehdi Hosseini
21st-century classical music
2009 compositions
Minimalistic compositions